Basehor is a city in Leavenworth County, Kansas, United States which is included statistically in the Kansas City metropolitan area.  As of the 2020 census, the population of the city was 6,896.

History

In exchange for extensive Delaware holdings in the state of Indiana, on September 24, 1829, the United States government ceded a large tract of land to the Delaware Indians. Basehor is built on a small part of this tract. The Delawares held this land, or at least parts of it, until the 1860s. On July 4, 1866, the Secretary of the Interior of the United States was offered for sale what was left of the Delaware lands, then referred to as the Delaware Diminished Reserve, for not less than $2.50 per acre. The Leavenworth, Pawnee, and Western Railroad Company subsequently bought all of the remaining land on January 7, 1886.

The first individuals to own the land upon which Basehor now stands were Thomas Salem and Mary Z. Towne (though William Henery Lewis, who surveyed for the railroad, bought an extensive plot of land to the northeast of Basehor around 1861 and homesteaded it right after the Civil War). The couple bought it from the railroad in 1873 and mortgaged it to Ephraim Basehor the same year. Ephriam and Reuben's nephew William Mast later moved to Basehor and in 1896 married Margaret Towne, the daughter of the couple from whom they had purchased the land.

Basehor was founded in 1889 by Reuben Basehor and his brother Ephraim. They both were of Pennsylvania Dutch descent and came to Kansas in 1854. After living in Lawrence for a time, Ephraim began working as a hired hand for an area farmer. He eventually bought the farm and other land holdings in the area.

In 1889, the railroad was completed, and Ephraim plotted his land and began building the town site. It was dedicated on November 30, 1889, and was named after Basehor.

Ephraim Basehor donated the land for the schoolhouse around 1900. The old grade school was located north of town and was originally called the Prairie Garden District #32. The first high school classes in the community met in 1905 above the Kemler-Hammond General Store. In 1906, a building was erected to house the high school and grade school. It was built for K–12 on the southeast corner of 155th Street and Leavenworth Road. The high school was upstairs, and K–8 was located in the three classrooms downstairs. In 1929, five students graduated.

Reuben Basehor donated $1,000 to the school to build a library. With this donation, a concrete structure was built east of the old school. After many years of disuse, the library building was moved to the city park in June, 2016.  A new two-story brick high school was built as a WPA project in 1938. The grade-school classes continued to be held in the old building until a new grade school was built in 1955. By 1963, a new high school was built, and the older building was taken over by the top two grades of the grade school. In 2008, the community built a new library on 158th St.

Geography
Basehor is located at  (39.138469, −94.938735).

Demographics

2010 census
As of the census of 2010,  4,613 people, 1,751 households, and 1,337 families were living in the city. The racial makeup of the city was 94.1% White, 2.5% African American, 0.4% Native American, 0.5% Asian, 0.5% from other races, and 1.9% from two or more races. Hispanics or Latinos of any race were 3.6% of the population.

Of the 1,751 households, 37.4% had children under 18 living with them, 62.8% were married couples living together, 9.4% had a female householder with no husband present, 4.1% had a male householder with no wife present, and 23.6% were not families. About 19.3% of all households were made up of individuals, and 7.7% had someone living alone who was 65 or older. The average household size was 2.63, and the average family size was 3.02.

The median age in the city was 37.6 years; 26.5% of residents were under 18; 6% were between 18 and 24; 28.4% were from 25 to 44; 27% were from 45 to 64; and 12.2% were 65 or older. The gender makeup of the city was 48.5% male and 51.5% female.

2000 census
As of the census of 2000,  2,238  people, 830  households, and 650  families were living in the city. The population density was 712.3  people per square mile (275.2/km2). The racial makeup of the city was 97.1% White, 0.4% African American, 0.3% Native American, 0.7% Asian, 0.5% from other races, and 0.9% from two or more races. Hispanics or Latinos of any race were 1.6% of the population.

Of the 830 households, 36.3% had children under 18 living with them, 64.5% were married couples living together, 11.1% had a female householder with no husband present, and 21.6% were not families. About 19.3% of all households were made up of individuals, and 9.0% had someone living alone who was 65 or older.  The average household size was 2.70, and the average family size was 3.09.

In the city, the age distribution was 27.2% under 18, 8.4% from 18 to 24, 28.1% from 25 to 44, 23.8% from 45 to 64, and 12.6% who were 65 or older.  The median age was 37 years. For every 100 females, there were 90.8 males. For every 100 females 18 and over, there were 87.4 males.

The median income for a household in the city was $52,831, and for a family was $60,000. Males had a median income of $40,540 versus $27,708 for females. The per capita income for the city was $20,731. About 2.8% of families and 4.1% of the population were below the poverty line, including 4.7% of those under 18 and 6.4% of those 65 or over.

Education
The city is served by Basehor–Linwood USD 458 public school district.  The Basehor–Linwood High School is located in Basehor. The cities middle school, however, is located on County RD. 2 (158th St). The district has five elementary schools: Glenwood Ridge Elementary located directly across from the middle school, Basehor Elementary School, Basehor Intermediate School, Gray Hawk Elementary School, and Linwood Elementary School, located in Linwood.

References

Further reading

External links
 City of Basehor
 Basehor – Directory of Public Officials
 Basehor city map, KDOT

Cities in Kansas
Cities in Leavenworth County, Kansas
Cities in Kansas City metropolitan area
Populated places established in 1889
1889 establishments in Kansas